Hypolamprus is a genus of moths of the family Thyrididae described by George Hampson in 1893.

Description
Palpi slight, upturned and reaching above vertex of head. Antennae minutely ciliated in male. Neuration is similar to Rhodoneura, differs due to stalked forewings in veins 8 and 9.

Species
Hypolamprus angulalis Moore, [1888]
Hypolamprus bastialis (Walker, 1859)
Hypolamprus crossosticha (Turner, 1911)
Hypolamprus curvifluus (Warren, 1898) (or Hypolamprus curviflua)
Hypolamprus distrinctus Whalley, 1971
Hypolamprus emblicalis Moore, 1888
Hypolamprus gangaba Whalley, 1971
Hypolamprus hypostilpna (Turner, 1941)
Hypolamprus janenschi (Gaede, 1917)
Hypolamprus kamadenalis (Strand, 1920)
Hypolamprus lepraota Hampson, 1910
Hypolamprus marginepunctalis (Leech, 1889)
Hypolamprus melilialis (Swinhoe, 1900)
Hypolamprus quaesitus Whalley, 1971
Hypolamprus reticulatus (Butler, 1886)
Hypolamprus sciodes Turner, 1911
Hypolamprus semiusta Warren, 1908
Hypolamprus striatalis (Swinhoe, 1885)
Hypolamprus stylophorus (Swinhoe, 1895)
Hypolamprus subrosealis (Leech, 1898)
Hypolamprus taphiusalis (Walker, 1859)
Hypolamprus tessellata (Swinhoe, 1904)
Hypolamprus ypsilon (Warren, 1899)

References

External links
An Illustrated Guide to the Thyridid Moths of Borneo

Thyrididae
Moth genera